Gymnastics was contested at the 1974 Asian Games, held in Tehran, Iran from September 1, 1974, to September 16, 1974. It was the first time that gymnastics was included as the medal sport in the Asian Games, and only artistic events were contested. In the Games, only four participating National Olympic Committees (NOCs) succeeded in winning any medal. China lead the medal table, with overall 18 medals (including eight gold), Japan finished second with four gold, and total nine medals. South Korea, although won only four total medals but its two gold helped it to clinch third position in final standings, while North Korea with one gold and 11 overall medals finished last.

Kazuo Horide of Japan won three gold medals in individual all-around, floor exercise and vault, and became most successful male gymnast of the Games. Jiang Shaoyi of China won gold medals in all the individual events (except vault), and became most successful gymnast of the Games. In men's events, China and Japan both won three gold medals, while two gold went to South Korea. Women's events were widely perceived as being dominated by the China, who claimed nine medals in total, including five golds.

Medalists

Men

Women

Medal table

References

 
1974 Asian Games events
1974
Asian Games
1974 Asian Games